Giulio Lana or Julius Lana (1561 – 1609) was a Roman Catholic prelate who served as Bishop of Vulturara e Montecorvino (1606–1609).

Biography
Julius Lana was born in Brescia, Italy in 1561. On 18 Dec 1606, he was appointed during the papacy of Pope Paul V as Bishop of Vulturara e Montecorvino. On 24 Dec 1606, he was consecrated bishop by Ottavio Paravicini, Cardinal-Priest of Sant'Alessio. He served as Bishop of Vulturara e Montecorvino until his death in 1609.

References

External links and additional sources 
 (for Chronology of Bishops) 
 (for Chronology of Bishops) 

17th-century Italian Roman Catholic bishops
1561 births
1609 deaths
Bishops appointed by Pope Paul V